"Juliet" is the sixth single by British pop rock band Lawson. The single was released as the second single from the re-issue of their debut studio album, Chapman Square (2012). The song was released on 11 October 2013, via Polydor Records. It debuted and peaked at number three on the UK Singles Chart, tying with "Taking Over Me" as their highest charting single to date.

Music video
Directed by Carly Cussen, the music video features model and actress, Kelly Brook, as Juliet.

Track listing
 Digital download
 "Juliet" - 3:14

Charts

Certifications

References

Lawson (band) songs
2013 singles
Polydor Records singles
2013 songs
Songs written by Carl Falk
Songs written by Michel Zitron
Songs written by Eric Turner (singer)